Seyyedan (also Romanized as Seyyedān; also known as Sa‘īdān, Saidūn, and Seydān) is a city and capital of Seyyedan District, in Marvdasht County, Fars Province, Iran.  At the 2006 census, its population was 7,555, in 1,954 families.

References

Populated places in Marvdasht County

Cities in Fars Province